Gabriele Uhlenbruck (born 27 October 1965 in Kettwig) is a German former field hockey player who competed in the 1988 Summer Olympics.

References

External links
 

1965 births
Living people
German female field hockey players
Olympic field hockey players of West Germany
Field hockey players at the 1988 Summer Olympics